Ram Sahaya Yadav (born 24 July 1970) is a Nepalese politician serving as the Vice president of Nepal since 20 March. He is a former minister for forests and environment of Nepal. He was elected vice president on 17 March 2023.
 
He was a member of the 1st Federal Parliament of Nepal. In the 2017 Nepalese general election he was elected from the Bara 2 constituency, securing 28185 (50.01%)  votes.

Political career
Yadav started his political carrier in 1990 by joining Nepal Sadbhawana Party. Later he became the founding general secretary of the Madhesi Jana Adhikar Forum. He was involved in the first Madhesh Movement of 2007. He was first elected in 2008 to the first Constituent Assembly from Bara district. In 2017, he was re-elected. 

Yadav also served as the Minister of Forest and Environment in Sher Bahadur Deuba's cabinet.

References

Nepal MPs 2017–2022
Living people
Government ministers of Nepal
Members of the 1st Nepalese Constituent Assembly
Nepal Sadbhawana Party politicians
Madhesi Jana Adhikar Forum, Nepal politicians
People's Socialist Party, Nepal politicians
1970 births
Nepal MPs 2022–present